The Caesar Rodney School District (CRSD) is a public school district based in Wyoming, Delaware (USA). The current superintendent is Dr. Christine Alois.

History
It was established on July 1, 1915, as State Consolidated District No. 1. The school board later chose the name Caesar Rodney as its namesake and it became the Caesar Rodney Consolidated School District. It merged with six other school districts to form the Caesar Rodney Special School District on July 1, 1919. The Comegys District merged into the Caesar Rodney district in 1937, and 11 other school districts merged into Caesar Rodney from 1919 until 1969. In 1969 the district assumed its current name as the Delaware Legislature forced the Magnolia and Oak Point school districts to merge into Caesar Rodney.

School districts that merged into the district included 14. Comegys/St. Jones, 20. Oak Point, 21. Oak Shade, 22. Camden, 22 1/2. Camden, 24. Petersburg, 25. duPoint, 27. Rising Sun/Lebanon, 27 1/2. Rising Sun/Lebanon, 50. Magnolia, 52. Willow Grove, 53. Frazier, 59. Pratts, 69. Westville, 71. Woodside, 74. Cedar Grove, 86. Logans, 99. duPont, 99 1/2. duPont, 106. Willow Grove, 108. Magnolia, 113. Wyoming, 113 1/2. Wyoming, 122. Rising Sun/Lebanon, 131. Woodside, 150. Star Hill, 151 Wyoming-Camden, 152 Willow Grove, 153. Thompson/Marydel/Parker's Chapel, and 154. Woodside. 23. Sandtown and 155. Mt. Olive were split between Caesar Rodney and Lake Forest. In Kent County, the former school districts numbered 133 and higher were designated for African-Americans during educational segregation in the United States.

Geography
The district covers a  area in central Kent County. 

In addition to Wyoming, other communities served by the district include Camden, Highland Acres, Kent Acres,  Magnolia, Rising Sun-Lebanon, Rodney Village, Woodside, most of Woodside East,  a small portion of Riverview, and the southern part of the state capital, Dover. The Dover Air Force Base also lies within the district. It also includes Marydel and Wild Quail.

Schools
High school
Caesar Rodney High School

Middle schools
Dover Air Base Middle School
Fred Fifer III Middle School
Magnolia Middle School
Postlethwait (F. Niel) Middle School

Elementary schools
Frear (Allen) Elementary School
Robinson (David E.) Elementary School
Simpson (W.B.) Elementary School
Star Hill Elementary School
Stokes (Nellie H.) Elementary School
Welch (George) Elementary School

Early childhood centers
McIlvaine Early Childhood Centers

Special schools
Caesar Rodney Early Intervention Programs (for students with special needs)

Athletics
The Riders have an outstanding history as one of the best Delawarean wrestling schools. In 2008, they also won the Football State Championship over Sussex Central High. Postlethwait and Fifer Middle Schools share the Riders mascot with the high school. Caesar Rodney competes in athletics as a member of the Henlopen Conference.

Alumni
Ian Snell, former MLB player
 Duron Harmon, New England Patriots defensive back
Laron Profit, former NBA player
Ashley Coleman, Miss Teen USA 1999
Dave Williams, former MLB player
Natalie Morales, television journalist for NBC News

See also
List of school districts in Delaware
Caesar Rodney

References

External links
Caesar Rodney School District

School districts in Kent County, Delaware
Dover, Delaware
1915 establishments in the United States
School districts established in 1915
1915 establishments in Delaware